Ryan Sutton (born 2 August 1995) is an English rugby league footballer who plays as a  and  for the Canterbury-Bankstown Bulldogs in the National Rugby League (NRL).

He previously played for the Canberra Raiders in the National Rugby League and the Wigan Warriors in the Super League, and on loan from Wigan at Workington Town in the Kingstone Press Championship.

Background
Sutton was born in Billinge, England. His father is Matthew Sutton, mother Alison Sutton née Johnson and brother Aidan Sutton.

Career

2014
Sutton made his team début as a substitute on 21 April 2014 in an 84–6 sweep over the Bradford Bulls. He made his first starting appearance for Wigan against Salford.

2016
He played in the 2016 Super League Grand Final victory over the Warrington Wolves at Old Trafford.

2017
Sutton played in the 2017 Challenge Cup Final defeat by Hull F.C. at Wembley Stadium.

2018
Sutton played in the 2018 Super League Grand Final victory over the Warrington Wolves at Old Trafford.
Sutton signed with the Canberra Raiders for the 2019 NRL season.

2019-2022
Sutton made a total of 20 appearances for Canberra in the 2019 NRL season as the club reached their first grand final in 25 years.  He did not play in the 2019 NRL Grand Final in which Canberra were defeated by the Sydney Roosters 14-8 at ANZ Stadium. Sutton went on to play a total of 75 games for Canberra between 2019 and 2022.

2023
On 3 March 2022, The Daily Telegraph reported that Sutton had signed a three-year deal with the Canterbury-Bankstown Bulldogs from 2023 onwards. He made his club debut in round 1 of the 2023 NRL season against the Manly-Warringah Sea Eagles which Canterbury lost 31-6.

International career
In July 2018 he was selected in the England Knights Performance squad.

He was selected in England 9s squad for the 2019 Rugby League World Cup 9s.

References

External links
Canberra Raiders profile
Wigan Warriors profile
SL profile

1995 births
Living people
Canberra Raiders players
Canterbury-Bankstown Bulldogs players
England Knights national rugby league team players
English rugby league players
Rugby league players from Billinge, Merseyside
Rugby league props
Wigan Warriors players